Graffiti U is the tenth studio album by New Zealand-born Australian country music singer Keith Urban. It was released on 27 April 2018, through Hit Red and Capitol Records Nashville. The album was heavily influenced by experiences from Urban's youth, and includes the singles "Female", "Parallel Line", "Coming Home" (featuring Julia Michaels), and "Never Comin' Down". The album has received mixed reviews from critics but received a nomination for CMA Award for Album of the Year.

Background
Keith Urban said that his first influences were records made by such artists as Johnny Cash, Charley Pride, and Merle Haggard that his father collected. After quitting school at age 15, he performed in cover bands that played a variety of musical styles. Urban also explained that Graffiti U was a combination of those styles he performed during his youth and listened to in his father's record collection.

Graffiti U is neither a song title nor a lyric on the record, but rather a phrase that Urban had come up with. The word "graffiti" came to him while he was working the album, because the process was like graffiti for him. "I have always loved that word, loved the sound of the word, and have loved that it's art-driven," he said. Urban added that "graffiti is free and pure, and very personal" and said, "I thought that this record feels like that to me." He also mentioned that the "U" part was "[both] the audience [and] the listener".

Promotion
The song "Female" was performed live during the 2017 CMA Awards. Urban also performed. On 23 April, he performed the song at a Spotify "Fans First" event in Nashville, Tennessee along with "Parallel Line" and "Wasted Time", from his previous album Ripcord. At the event, he took questions from fans and displayed murals created by five local artists inspired by songs from the album. he performed the song at UMG showcase at CRS (Country Radio Seminar) with Nicolle Galyon who sang back up vocals on the track and was a co-writer of the song. https://twitter.com/keithurban/status/961396072684904449

Singles
"Female" was released as the album's lead single on 8 November 2017. It was inspired by the Me Too movement. It reached number 12 on the US Billboard Country Airplay chart, his first single to miss the top 10 since his 1999 hit "It's a Love Thing". "Parallel Line" was released as the album's second single on 18 January 2018 in Australia and Great Britain, but was not released to country radio. The album's third single, "Coming Home" featuring American singer-songwriter Julia Michaels was released on 21 March 2018. This song peaked at number 3 on Country Airplay. Finishing off the single releases was "Never Comin' Down”. This song peaked at number 18, making it his first American album since 2006's “Love, Pain & the Whole Crazy Thing” to not produce a single number one hit, and his first album since 2010's “Get Closer” not to have a single reach the top 40 on the Billboard Hot 100 chart.

Critical reception

Graffiti U has received mixed to negative reviews from music critics. Stephen Thomas Erlewine of AllMusic gave the album three out of five stars, criticizing Urban's attempt to address complicated sexual politics. He pointed to the song "Gemini", questioning the narrator's solidarity due to the provocative lyrics. Jonathan Bernstein of Rolling Stone gave a two-and-a-half-star review of the album, saying "Urban deserves credit for refusing to rest on his laurels during the height of his arena-headlining mid-career, but on Graffiti U he ends up shining brightest in his well-worn comfort zones while struggling, perhaps for the first time, when he tries to break new sonic and lyrical ground".

Commercial performance
In the United States, Graffiti U debuted at number two on the Billboard 200 with 145,000 album-equivalent units of which 137,000 were in pure album sales. The album benefited from a concert ticket/album sale redemption offer with Urban's latest tour, which began on 15 June 2018. It became Urban's seventh top 10 album in the country. It also debuted atop the Top Country Albums chart, becoming Urban's sixth number-one album on that chart. In its second week, the album fell to number 18 on the Billboard 200 and number three on the Top Country Albums chart, with 17,100 copies sold that week. The album was certified Gold by the RIAA on July 24, 2019. As of July 2019, the album has sold 282,400 copies in the United States.

Track listing
Adapted from iTunes.

Notes

Personnel
Adapted from liner notes

"Coming Home"
Julia Michaels - featured vocals
J.R. Rotem - bass guitar, percussion, piano, programming, synthesizer
Keith Urban - all vocals, electric guitar

"Never Comin' Down"
James "J-Hart" Abrahart - gang vocals
Shy Carter - vocal percussion, breakdown vocals, gang vocals
Josh Kerr - programming, gang vocals
Aaron Sterling - drums
Keith Urban - bass guitar, electric guitar, lead vocals background vocals, gang vocals

"Same Heart"
Jason Evigan - keyboards, programming
Keith Urban - electric guitar, lead vocals, background vocals
Emily Weisband - background vocals

"My Wave"
Shy Carter - lead vocals, background vocals
Keith Urban - guitar, lead vocals, background vocals
Greg Wells - acoustic guitar, bass guitar, drums, programming

"Parallel Line"
Benny Blanco - keyboards, programming
Johnny McDaid - keyboards, programming
Pino Palladino - bass guitar
Ed Sheeran - acoustic guitar, programming
Keith Urban - electric guitar, all vocals

"Drop Top"
Kassi Ashton - lead vocals, background vocals
Jimmy Robbins - keyboards, programming
Jesse Shatkin - drums, percussion, programming, keyboards, synthesizer
Keith Urban - guitar, bass guitar, piano, percussion, lead vocals, background vocals

"Way Too Long"
David Bukovinszky - cello
Mattias Bylund - string arranger
Johan Carlsson - keyboards
Michael Engström - bass guitar
Oscar Holter - keyboards, percussion, programming
Mattias Johansson - violin
Keith Urban - all vocals, acoustic guitar

"Horses"
Lindsay Ell - background vocals
Mozella - background vocals
Matt Musty - drums
Pino Palladino - bass guitar
Matt Rad - guitar, piano, keyboards, drums, percussion, background vocals
Jamie Scott - background vocals
Keith Urban - guitar, lead vocals, background vocals
Eric Valentine - drums

"Gemini"
Ian Kirkpatrick - keyboards, programming
Seth Rausch - drums
Keith Urban - guitar, lead vocals, background vocals

"Texas Time"
Mike Elizondo - bass guitar, keyboards
Drew Erickson - clavinet, keyboards
Aaron Sterling - drums, percussion
Max Townsley - acoustic guitar, dobro, background vocals
Keith Urban - guitar, lead vocals, background vocals

"Love the Way It Hurts (So Good)"
Ben Berger - keyboards, programming, background vocals
Ryan McMahon - guitar, programming, background vocals
Ryan Rabin - keyboards, programming, background vocals
Keith Urban - lead vocals, background vocals

"Female"
Ross Copperman - acoustic guitar, electric guitar, programming
Nicolle Galyon - background vocals
Charlie Judge - keyboards, synthesizer, strings
Nicole Kidman - background vocals
Keith Urban - electric guitar, lead vocals

"Steal My Thunder"
Jason Evigan - electric guitar, keyboards, programming
Keith Urban - acoustic guitar, electric guitar, lead vocals, background vocals
Emily Weisband - background vocals

Charts

Weekly charts

Year-end charts

Certifications

References

2018 albums

Capitol Records albums
Keith Urban albums
Albums produced by Jason Evigan